The following is a timeline of the history of the city of Makhachkala, Dagestan, Russia.

19th century

 1844 - Anji Fortress built by Russians.
 1852 - Petrovsky lighthouse built.
 1857 - Petrovsk-Port granted town status.
 1870 - Harbor constructed.
 1896 - Rostov-Baku railway built.
 1897 - Population: 9,806.

20th century

 1919
 No. 221 Squadron RAF and No. 266 Squadron RAF of the United Kingdom based in Petrovsk.
 Population: 18,000.
 1920 - 30 March: Red Army takes city.
 1921 - 14 May: City becomes capital of Dagestan Autonomous Soviet Socialist Republic.
 1922 - Petrovsk renamed "Makhachkala."
 1925 - Russian Drama Theatre established.
 1927 - Dynamo Stadium (Makhachkala) opens.
 1931 - Teachers' Training Institute founded.
 1932 - Dagestankaya Pravda newspaper in publication.
 1937 - "Tanker basin" built.
 1939  - Population: 86,836.
 1944 - Spiritual Directorate of the Muslims of the North Caucasus headquartered in Makhachkala (approximate date).
 1946 - Football Club Dynamo Makhachkala formed.
 1957 - Dagestan State University established.
 1958 - Dagestan Museum of Fine Arts opens.
 1965 - Population: 152,000.
 1970
 14 May: Earthquake.
 Population: 185,863.
 1980 - Mountain Botanical Garden of the Dagestan Scientific Centre established.
 1985 - Population: 301,000.
 1990 - Dagestan Scientific Centre established.
 1991
 City becomes capital of the Dagestan Republic.
 Football Club Anzhi Makhachkala formed.
 13 June: Muslim demonstration.
 1995 - Football Club Anzhi-Bekenez Makhachkala formed.
 1996 - August: Bombing.
 1998
 Said Amirov becomes mayor.
 Makhachkala Grand Mosque consecrated.

21st century

 2001 - November: Trial of Salman Raduyev begins.
 2002
 18 January: Bombing.
 Population: 462,412.
 2003 - Chernovik newspaper begins publication.
 2005 - 1 July: Makhachkala Rus bombing.
 2006 - City flag and coat of arms designs adopted.
 2009 - 15 January: Aircraft collision.
 2010 - Population: 572,076.
 2011
 22 November: Bombings.
 25 November: Protest.
 2012 - 3 May: Bombings.
 2013 - 1 June: Mayor Said Amirov arrested.

See also
 History of Makhachkala
 Administrative divisions of Makhachkala
 History of Dagestan
 Timelines of other cities in the North Caucasian Federal District of Russia: Grozny

References

This article incorporates information from the German Wikipedia and the Russian Wikipedia.

Bibliography

External links

 

Makhachkala
Makhachkala
Makhachkala
Years in Russia